Since 1987, Telefiction (fr. Téléfiction) is an important player of  TV and cinema production industry of Canada. Its branch, Téléfiction Productions, produced more than 1350 hours of TV content which include 675 hours of fiction content for youth, 64 hours of fiction content for prime time, 615 hours of documentaries, magazines and other genres. The movie branch, Films Vision 4, made 25 feature films. Other branch 'Les Éditions Imagine' published 84 albums for youth since its creation in 2003.

In 2012-2013 Telefiction and its branches expect to produce  more than 130 X 30 minutes of fiction programs for children and youth, 25 hours of TV magazines, two special programs of the series Сomme par magie (Like Magic), one feature film, two internet-sites. Les Éditions Imagine will edit 8 illustrated albums for children.

Telefiction is one of the most important producers of programs for children of  3–8 years old in Canada. The series Toc Toc Toc is aired both on Radio-Canada and on Télé-Québec. Another series, 1, 2, 3…Géant (1,2,3...Giant) is produced for Télé-Québec and TFO.

Films Vision 4
Founded in 1982, Films Vision 4 is a branch of movie cinematography production of Telefiction. Its portfolio contains the films of variable genres : thirty feature films such as Aurelie Laflamme's Diary (Le journal d'Aurélie Laflamme), Free Fall (Les Pieds dans le vide), Duo, The Outlander (Le Survenant), Red Nose (Nez rouge), The Mysterious Miss C. (La mystérieuse mademoiselle C.), The Pig's Law (La loi du cochon), Pin-Pon, le film, The Last Breath (Le Dernier souffle), Matusalem, La Florida, and many others.

Imagine
Imagine is a young publishing house for children.  It edited more than 80 albums for youth, 90% of them  realized by Canadian authors and illustrators.

External links
 Official Site
 site IMDB

Film production companies of Canada
Television production companies of Canada